Anyox is a Canadian documentary film, directed by Ryan Ermacora and Jessica Johnson and released in 2022. The film is a history of the ghost town of Anyox, British Columbia, profiling both the environmental impacts of its abandoned mining facilities and the history of labour relations in the town before its abandonment.

The film premiered in March 2022 at the Cinéma du Réel film festival in France, and was screened in September at the Open City Documentary Festival in England. It is slated to have its Canadian premiere at the 2022 Vancouver International Film Festival.

The film was longlisted for the Directors Guild of Canada's 2022 Jean-Marc Vallée DGC Discovery Award.

References

External links
 

2022 films
2022 documentary films
Canadian documentary films
Films shot in British Columbia
2020s English-language films
2020s Canadian films